Kamel is a given name meaning perfect or the perfect one. It may refer to:

People with the given name Kamel

 Abdullah Kamel Abdullah Kamel Al Kandari (born 1973), Kuwaiti extrajudicial prisoner of the United States
 Hassan Kamel Al-Sabbah (1895–1935), Lebanese engineer
 Kamel Ajlouni (born 1943), Jordanian endocrinologist
 Kamel al-Budeiri (1882–1923), Palestinian politician
 Kamel al-Kilani (born 1958), Iraqi politician
 Kamel Al-Mousa (born 1982), Saudi Arabian football player
 Kamel Asaad (1932–2010), Lebanese politician
 Kamel Ayari, Tunisian wheelchair racer
 Kamel Boughanem (born 1979), Moroccan-French football player
 Kamel Chafni (born 1982), Moroccan football player
 Kamel Ghilas (born 1984), Algerian football player
 Kamel Hana Gegeo (died 1988), Iraqi murder victim
 Kamel Habri (born 1976), Algerian football player
 Kamel Kardjena (born 1981), Algerian Paralympic athlete
 Kamel Lemoui, Algerian footballer
 Kamel Maghur (1935–2002), Libyan lawyer
 Kamel Marek (born 1980), Algerian football player
 Kamel Morjane (born 1948), Tunisian politician
 Kamel Nacif Borge (21st century), Mexican businessman
 Kamel Ouejdide (born 1980), French-Moroccan football player
 Kamel Rabat Bouralha (21st century), Algerian-British prisoner of Russia
 Kamel Ramdani (born 1981), French-Algerian football player
 Kamel Amin Thaabet (1924–65), Israeli spy
 Kamel Zaiem (born 1983), Tunisian footballer
 Mohamed Kamel Amr (born 1942), Egyptian diplomat
 Zainab Kamel Ali (21st century), Djiboutian politician

People with the surname Kamel

 Bishoy Kamel (1931–1979), Egyptian saint
 Fateh Kamel (21st century), Algerian-Canadian alleged terrorist
 Fathi Kamel (born 1955), Kuwaiti footballer
 Florence Jaukae Kamel, Papua New Guinea artist and designer
 Georg Joseph Kamel (1661–1706), Czech botanist and pharmacist, active in the Philippines
 Henry Ford Kamel (1961–2012), Ghanaian banker and politician
 Hussein Kamel of Egypt (1853–1917), Sultan of Egypt
 Hussein Kamel al-Majid (died 1996), Iraqi general
 Ibrahim Kamel (born 1988), Iraqi football player
 Kamel Asaad (21st century), Lebanese politician
 Kamel Larbi (footballer) (born 1985), Algerian football player
 Nada Kamel  (born 27) is an Egyptian archer
 Saddam Kamel (died 1996), Iraqi murder victim
 Saleh Abdullah Kamel (21st century), Saudi Arabian businessman
 Stanley Kamel (1943–2008), American television actor
 Tarek Kamel (21st century), Egyptian politician
 Yusuf Saad Kamel (born 1983), Bahraini athlete
Abdel Hakim Abdel Samad Kamel (born 1967), Egyptian singer

See also
Kamil

Masculine given names